Way Back Home may refer to:

Music
 Way Back Home (Bing Crosby album), 1951
 Way Back Home (Phil Keaggy album), 1986
 The Way Back Home, an album by Vince Gill, 1987
 "Way Back Home" (Shaun song), from his extended play, Take
 "Way Back Home", an instrumental tune by the Jazz Crusaders, written by Wilton Felder.
 "Way Back Home", a single of the Jazz Crusaders tune with added lyrics, by Junior Walker and the All-Stars from their 1971 album Rainbow Funk
 "Way Back Home", a song from Prince's album Art Official Age

Film
 Way Back Home (1931 film), an American drama film
 Way Back Home (2011 film), a Filipino family drama film
 Way Back Home (2013 film), a South Korean drama film

Other
 Way Back Home (travelogue), an Indian travelogue series